Hulayqat was a Palestinian Arab village in the Gaza Subdistrict. It was depopulated during the 1947–1948 Civil War in Mandatory Palestine. It was located 20.5 km northeast of Gaza.

History
Hulayqat had numerous khirbas. Artifacts include pieces of marble and pottery as well as cisterns and a pool.

Ottoman era
In 1838,  in the Ottoman era, Huleikat was noted as  village in the  Gaza district.

An  Ottoman village list from about 1870 showed that   Hulayqat  had  a population of 55, with a total of  14  houses, though the population count included men, only. 

In 1883, the PEF's Survey of Western Palestine described it as a "small village on a flat slope, with a high sandy hill to the west. It has cisterns and a pond, with a small garden to the west.”

British Mandate era

In the 1922 census of Palestine, conducted by the British Mandate authorities, Hukiqat  had a population of 251 inhabitants,  all Muslims,  increasing in the 1931 census  to 285, still all Muslims, in  61 houses.

In the 1945 statistics   Huleiqat  had a population of 420 Muslims,   with a total of  7,063  dunams of land, according to an official land and population survey.   Of this,  115 dunams were used  for  plantations and irrigable land, 6,636 for cereals, while they had 18  dunams as built-up land.

In 1947, an oil drilling project commenced in Hulayqat employing 300 Arab workers.

1948, aftermath
The village was first captured by the Israeli army on 13 May during Operation Barak and depopulated.  On 8 July, it was retaken by the Egyptian army. A well-fortified battalion of the 4th Brigade was stationed there  later reinforced by more troops. and some of the villagers returned to their homes. It was finally captured on 19 October by the Giv'ati Brigade during Operation Yoav.

According to the Palestinian historian Walid Khalidi, the ruin of the village in 1992 was partially forested with sycamore, Christ's-thorn trees and cactus. One of the old roads had been paved.

See also
 Battles of the Separation Corridor

References

Bibliography

External links
Welcome To Hulayqat 
Hulayqat,  Zochrot
Survey of Western Palestine, Map 20:   IAA, Wikimedia commons 
Hulayqat, from the Khalil Sakakini Cultural Center

Arab villages depopulated during the 1948 Arab–Israeli War
District of Gaza